Freq may refer to:

 Frequency (abbreviation)
 Neuronal calcium sensor-1, protein also known as frequenin homolog or freq

Arts and entertainment 
 Freq (album), 1985 album by English singer and musician Robert Calvert
 Frequency (video game), a music video game
 Freq Nasty, real name Darin McFayden, an American DJ and music producer
 WLEJ-FM, a Centre County, Pennsylvania radio station formerly branded as "The Freq" under call sign WFEQ

See also

 
 
 Freek (disambiguation)
 Freak (disambiguation)
 Phreak
 Phreek